Bryan Keith Robinson (June 22, 1974June 11, 2016), nicknamed "Big Dog", was an American football defensive tackle. He was originally signed by the St. Louis Rams as an undrafted free agent in 1997.

Robinson also played for the Chicago Bears, the Miami Dolphins, the Cincinnati Bengals, and the Arizona Cardinals.

College career
He began his college football career at College of the Desert in Palm Desert, CA.  After College of the Desert, Robinson and Bill Hall beat Steve Sarkisian of El Camino College in the 1994 Southern California Bowl at College of the Desert. Robinson transferred to the Fresno State Bulldogs in 1995.

Professional career

St. Louis Rams 
Bryan Robinson played one season with the St. Louis Rams in 1997, after making the roster as an undrafted free agent.

Chicago Bears
Robinson made one of the most memorable plays in recent Chicago Bears history on November 7, 1999. Playing at Green Bay in the first Bears game since the death of Walter Payton, he blocked a 28-yard Ryan Longwell field goal attempt in the final seconds to preserve a 14–13 victory over the Packers. He was waived on September 5, 2004. At the time of his release, he was the longest tenured player on the Chicago Bears defense.

Miami Dolphins 
On September 7, 2004, Robinson signed a 1-year contract worth $1.5 million with the Miami Dolphins. He played in all 16 games and notched 41 tackles in his lone season with the Dolphins.

Cincinnati Bengals 
On March 13, 2005, The Cincinnati Bengals signed Bryan Robinson to a 3-year contract worth $6 million, including a $1.7 million signing bonus.

Arizona Cardinals
On April 11, 2008, Robinson was signed by the Arizona Cardinals. He would go on to appear in his first Super Bowl when the Cardinals faced the Steelers in Super Bowl XLIII. The Cardinals would lose the game 27–23.

Death
On June 11, 2016, Robinson was found dead of hypertensive heart disease in a Milwaukee motel room.

References

1974 births
2016 deaths
American football defensive ends
American football defensive tackles
Arizona Cardinals players
Chicago Bears players
Cincinnati Bengals players
Fresno State Bulldogs football players
Miami Dolphins players
St. Louis Rams players
College of the Desert Roadrunners football players
Sportspeople from Toledo, Ohio
African-American players of American football
20th-century African-American sportspeople
21st-century African-American sportspeople
Deaths from hypertension